Zagórze may refer to the following places in Poland:

In Lesser Poland Voivodeship (south Poland):
Zagórze, Chrzanów County
Zagórze, Gorlice County
Zagórze, Wadowice County
Zagórze, Wieliczka County
Zagórze, Goral Lands, Limanowa County

In Łódź Voivodeship (central Poland):
Zagórze, Gmina Gidle
Zagórze, Gmina Wielgomłyny
Zagórze, Rawa County
Zagórze, Skierniewice County
Zagórze, Wieruszów County

In Lublin Voivodeship (east Poland):
Zagórze, Łęczna County
Zagórze, Lublin County

In Lubusz Voivodeship (west Poland):
Zagórze, Strzelce-Drezdenko County
Zagórze, Świebodzin County
Zagórze, Zielona Góra County

In Masovian Voivodeship (east-central Poland):
Zagórze, Mińsk County
Zagórze, Otwock County
Zagórze, Przysucha County

In Pomeranian Voivodeship (north Poland):
 Zagórze (Rumia)

In Silesian Voivodeship (south Poland):
Zagórze, Sosnowiec
Zagórze, Częstochowa County
Zagórze, Myszków County

In Subcarpathian Voivodeship (south-east Poland):
Zagórze, Dębica County
Zagórze, Przeworsk County 

In Świętokrzyskie Voivodeship (south-central Poland):
Zagórze, Gmina Bliżyn
Zagórze, Gmina Łączna
Zagórze, Jędrzejów County
Zagórze, Pińczów County

In West Pomeranian Voivodeship (north-west Poland):
Zagórze, Białogard County
Zagórze, Kamień County

Also:
Zagórze, Podlaskie Voivodeship (north-east Poland)
Zagórze, a neighbourhood on Ostrów Tumski, Poznań

See also
Zagórz, a town in Sanok County, Subcarpathian Voivodeship
Zagórz, West Pomeranian Voivodeship, a village
Zagórze Śląskie, a village in the administrative district of Gmina Walim, within Wałbrzych County, Lower Silesian Voivodeship